Arthrosphaeridae is a family of giant pill millipedes that are found in Madagascar, the Western Ghats of India, and Sri Lanka. The largest pill-millipede in the world, Zoosphaerium neptunus (Butler 1872) belongs to this family and is known to swarm at certain times of the year.

Description 
The first segment of the anterior telopods have a stridulatory organ known as a "harp" and this has one to ten ribs. The anal plate on the female is enlarged and has 1-12 ribs while the male anal shield has no special sclerotized notch as seen in other families. The segments of the antenna are oval or cylindrical.

Taxonomy 
Within the family Arthrosphaeridae there are four genus formally described:

 Arthrosphaera Pocock, 1895 – India, Sri Lanka
 Zoosphaerium Pocock, 1895 – Madagascar
 Sphaeromimus de Saussure & Zehntner, 1902 – Southeast Madagascar
 Microsphaerotherium Wesener & van den Spiegel, 2007 – Madagascar

References

External links

Sphaerotheriida
Millipedes of Asia
Millipedes of Africa
Millipede families